Acsa or ACSA may refer to:

Acronyms
 Acquisition and Cross-Servicing Agreement
 Airports Company South Africa, a South African airport operator
 American CueSports Alliance, although their official acronym is simply "ACS"
 American Czech and Slovak Association, facilitating Czech and Slovak relations with the United States
 Anglican Church of Southern Africa, the Anglican province covering Southern Africa
 Anvil City Science Academy, a school in Alaska, US
 Apple Certified System Administrator, an Apple Computer certification program
 Army of the Confederate States of America, the "regular army" component of the Confederate States Army
 Association of Cardiothoracic Surgical Assistants, representing surgical assistants in cardiothoracics
 Australian Catholic Students Association
 AIDS council of South Australia, an advisor to the Sex Industry Network

Places
 Acsa, a village in Pest County, Hungary

See also
 ACSA-CAAH, Canadian Association for Adolescent Health
 Asca, a genus of mites